Walid Kewikha Muhammed, also known as Wali Dewane (1826–1881) was a Kurdish poet. Dewane was born in Said Sadiq city.

References

1826 births
1881 deaths
Kurdish-language poets
Kurdish poets
19th-century poets
People from Sulaymaniyah